Sax No End is an album by the Kenny Clarke/Francy Boland Big Band with guest soloist Eddie "Lockjaw" Davis featuring performances recorded in Germany in 1967 and released on the SABA label. The album was also released in the US on Prestige Records as Fire, Heat, Soul & Guts!.

Reception

The AllMusic review called it "a powerfully swinging session, a mixture of the wallop of Count Basie and the modernism of Gil Evans and Bob Brookmeyer".

Track listing
All compositions by Francy Boland, except where indicated.
 "New Box" - 6:08
 "Sax No End" - 5:05
 "Griff's Groove" - 5:05
 "Lockjaw Blues" - 3:02 	
 "The Turk" - 2:20
 "Milkshake" (Kenny Clarke) - 5:02
 "Peter's Waltz" (Sahib Shihab) - 5:01
 "Griff'n Jaw" - 3:33

Personnel 
Kenny Clarke - drums
Francy Boland - piano, arranger
Benny Bailey, Jimmy Deuchar, Idrees Sulieman - trumpet
Shake Keane - trumpet, flugelhorn
Nat Peck, Åke Persson, Eric van Lier - trombone
Derek Humble - alto saxophone 
Eddie "Lockjaw" Davis, Carl Drevo, Johnny Griffin, Ronnie Scott - tenor saxophone 
Sahib Shihab - baritone saxophone
Jimmy Woode - bass
Fats Sadi - bongos

References 

1967 albums
Kenny Clarke/Francy Boland Big Band albums
MPS Records albums
Prestige Records albums